Rambaikulam Girls' Maha Vidyalayam ( Rampaikkuḷam Peṇkaḷ Makā Vittiyālayam) is a national school in Vavuniya, Sri Lanka.

See also
 List of schools in Northern Province, Sri Lanka

References

External links
 Rambaikulam Girls' Maha Vidyalayam

Educational institutions established in 1890
Girls' schools in Sri Lanka
National schools in Sri Lanka
Schools in Vavuniya
1890 establishments in Ceylon